Tony Paynter (born August 23, 1970) is an American politician who has served in the West Virginia House of Delegates from the 25th district since 2016.

References

1970 births
Living people
Republican Party members of the West Virginia House of Delegates
21st-century American politicians